Jeannette Charles (born 15 October 1927) is a retired British actress who has often portrayed Queen Elizabeth II due to her resemblance to the monarch.

Biography
Charles appeared as an actress in repertory theatre in her twenties, but had difficulty obtaining Equity membership. Her resemblance to Queen Elizabeth II made it difficult to obtain roles, and she eventually left acting to become a secretary.

In 1972, a painting she commissioned of herself in her forties (as a present for her husband) was displayed by the artist at the Royal Academy in London, where it was taken to be a portrait of the Queen. On the assumption the painting was of the Queen, it was disqualified as portraits had to be painted from life. When it was revealed that it was not the Queen, Charles (as the actual subject of the painting) received a great deal of press attention, and started receiving offers to portray the Queen in print advertisements. Charles accepted the offers she felt were appropriate (turning down, for instance, offers to portray the queen in lingerie or, in one case, as a centrefold), and insisted that it be made clear in any advertisement that the Queen was being played by an impersonator.

After studying the Queen's voice, as well as her appearance, Charles also made in-character personal appearances at trade shows and corporate events, and soon broadened into film. Charles has played the role of Queen Elizabeth II in many films including Secrets of a Superstud (1976), Queen Kong (1976), The Rutles' movie All You Need Is Cash (1978), National Lampoon's European Vacation (1985), The Naked Gun: From the Files of Police Squad! (1988) and Austin Powers in Goldmember (2002).

Charles also appeared as a semi-regular in Spike Milligan's Q series on BBC Television and appeared on Channel 4's Big Brother 10 to surprise the Brazilian contestant Rodrigo Lopes (who thought he was meeting the real Queen Elizabeth II for a task).

Charles also appeared in Saturday Night Live episode Season 2, Episode 20 in 1977 and Mind Your Language episode Season 2, Episode 2, "Queen for a Day", in 1978.

Charles retired in 2014 and lives in Chelmsford, Essex.

Partial filmography
Leos Leiden (1976) - The Queen
Secrets of a Superstud (1976) - The Lady
Queen Kong (1976) - HM The Queen (uncredited)
All You Need Is Cash (aka The Rutles) (1978) - A Queen of England
National Lampoon's European Vacation (1985) - Queen Elizabeth
Nipagesh Bachof (1987) - Queen of England
The Naked Gun: From the Files of Police Squad! (1988) - Queen Elizabeth II
The Parent Trap (1998) - Queen Elizabeth II (deleted scene)
Tusenårsfesten (1999) - Queen Elizabeth II 
Austin Powers in Goldmember (2002) - Queen Elizabeth II

References

External links
 

1927 births
Living people
British film actresses
British stage actresses
English impressionists (entertainers)
Place of birth missing (living people)